Suzanne B. Conlon (born January 17, 1939) is an American attorney and jurist who is a Senior United States district judge of the United States District Court for the Northern District of Illinois.

Early life and education

Conlon was born in Portland, Oregon. She received a Bachelor of Arts degree from Mundelein College in 1963, a Juris Doctor from Loyola University Chicago School of Law in 1968, and a diploma in foreign and comparative law from the University of London in 1971.

Career

She was a law clerk to Judge Edwin Albert Robson of the United States District Court for the Northern District of Illinois from 1968 to 1971. She was in private practice in Chicago, Illinois from 1972 to 1975. She was a member of the faculty of DePaul University from 1972 to 1975, as an assistant professor from 1972 to 1973 and a lecturer from 1973 to 1975. She was an Assistant United States Attorney of the Northern District of Illinois from 1976 to 1977, of the Central District of California from 1977 to 1982, and in Illinois again from 1982 to 1986. She was assistant general counsel to the United States Sentencing Commission in 1986, and was executive director of the commission from 1986 to 1987. She was a special counsel to Associate United States Attorney General Stephen S. Trott in 1988. She has been an adjunct professor at the Northwestern University School of Law from 1991 to the present.

Federal judicial service

On April 2, 1987, Conlon was nominated by President Ronald Reagan to a seat on the United States District Court for the Northern District of Illinois vacated by Judge Thomas Roberts McMillen. She was confirmed by the United States Senate on February 19, 1988, and received her commission on February 22, 1988. She assumed senior status on April 17, 2004. Conlon no longer maintains a docket in the Northern District of Illinois, but continues to hear cases as a visiting judge on other Federal courts.

Notable opinions

In 2011, in a highly publicized case, Conlon ruled in favor of Anita Alvarez (in her official capacity as State's Attorney for Cook County), granting the defendant's motion to dismiss ACLU v. Alvarez on the grounds of lack of jurisdiction by the district court. The suit sought to address the constitutionality of a state act that prohibits citizens from audio-taping on-duty police officers without the consent of the officers, with the ACLU arguing that the act ran counter to First Amendment principles. She was reversed by the Seventh Circuit Court of Appeals, which held that "[t]he Illinois eavesdropping statute restricts far more speech than necessary to protect legitimate privacy interests; as applied to the facts alleged here, it likely violates the First Amendment's free speech and free-press guarantees." The Seventh Circuit reversed and remanded with instructions to the district court to reopen the case and allow the amended complaint and enter a preliminary injunction enjoining the State's Attorney from applying the Illinois eavesdropping statute against the ACLU. Judge Posner dissented from the majority opinion, writing that he would have upheld Judge Conlon's opinion, albeit under different reasoning.

In 1992, Conlon granted an injunction to block the Chicago Cubs' move from the National League East to the National League West for the 1993 season.

Criticism and controversy

Conlon was rated by lawyers as a judge that had the lowest number of pending cases in the entire Northern District of Illinois but was criticized over her temperament throughout her career. Lawyers have said to accomplish her goal of a small docket, Conlon made inappropriate demands on attorneys. Attorneys have been critical of Conlon's scheduling, claiming it was unrealistic, but nonetheless enforced inflexibly. The Chicago Bar Association and many judicial rating websites claimed she had unacceptable behavior for a federal judge. It was suggested that she had the tendency to use the jury or others to call out attorneys that are late. While the majority of criticism focused on her temperament, her substantive case management was also criticized.

In a 2007 evaluation of senior judges of the Northern District of Illinois, the Chicago Council of Lawyers developed a 34-question written survey designed to assess each judge's legal ability, integrity, temperament, decisiveness, and diligence. The surveys were disseminated widely, and completed surveys were returned by 137 lawyers. Conlon was praised "for her intelligence, legal ability, and the quality and timeliness of her written opinions." Her written opinions were rated as consistently thoughtful and well reasoned; however, she received the worst mark of any judge in the category of "gives due consideration to the convenience of lawyers and litigants in scheduling proceedings" and was described by attorneys as "abrupt, unpleasant, intolerant, and condescending." She also received the worst marks of any judge for "courtesy towards lawyers and litigants" and was criticized for an unwillingness to facilitate settlements of civil matters, receiving the worst mark of any judge for "effectively assist[ing] the parties to reach settlement." The council's assessment of Judge Conlon concluded: "In summary, Judge Conlon's rigidity in scheduling matters, her poor judicial temperament, and her refusal to facilitate settlements in civil matters appear to have overshadowed her excellent legal abilities and diligence on the bench."

Conlon's temperament has also been noted in several notable controversies during her tenure as a federal judge. First, she fired a law clerk for refusing to carry her lunch up a flight of stairs when the elevator was not working. Second, she fired a law clerk on September 11, 2001 for complying with an evacuation order on the Everett McKinley Dirksen United States Courthouse in Downtown Chicago. On judicial ratings websites, court staff noted that Conlon's voluntary law clerk attrition rate was very high and that she consistently fired secretaries and courtroom deputies.

References

Sources
 

1939 births
Living people
Alumni of the University of London
Lawyers from Portland, Oregon
Loyola University Chicago School of Law alumni
Judges of the United States District Court for the Northern District of Illinois
United States district court judges appointed by Ronald Reagan
20th-century American judges
DePaul University faculty
Assistant United States Attorneys
Northwestern University Pritzker School of Law faculty
American women legal scholars
American legal scholars
21st-century American judges
20th-century American women judges
21st-century American women judges